The Stain of Shame (German: Der Schandfleck) is a 1917 Austrian silent drama film directed by Jacob Fleck and Luise Fleck and starring Liane Haid, Karl Ehmann and Anton Tiller.

Cast
 Liane Haid
 Karl Ehmann
 Anton Tiller
 Hans Rhoden
 Herr Selder
 Eduard Sekler
 Josephine Josephi
 Marianne Wulff
 Max Brebeck

References

Bibliography
 Robert Von Dassanowsky. Austrian Cinema: A History. McFarland, 2005.

External links

Austro-Hungarian films
1917 films
Austrian silent feature films
Austrian drama films
Films directed by Jacob Fleck
Films directed by Luise Fleck
Austrian black-and-white films
1917 drama films
Films based on works by Ludwig Anzengruber
Films based on Austrian novels
Silent drama films